The following are the national records in Olympic weightlifting in Madagascar. Records are maintained in each weight class for the snatch lift, clean and jerk lift, and the total for both lifts by the Malagasy Weightlifting Federation.

Current records

Men

Women

Historical records

Men (1998–2018)

References

Madagascar
Olympic weightlifting
weightlifting
records